The 1926 Nassau hurricane also known as the San Liborio hurricane or The Great Bahamas Hurricane of 1926, in Puerto Rico, was a destructive Category 4 hurricane that affected the Bahamas at peak intensity. Although it weakened considerably before its Florida landfall, it was one of the most severe storms to affect the Bahamian capital Nassau and the island of New Providence in several years until the 1928 Okeechobee hurricane, which occurred just two years later. The storm also delivered flooding rains and loss of crops to the southeastern United States and Florida. Being a slightly mid-range Category 4, this hurricane peaked at about 967 mbars, making it the least intense Category 4 Atlantic hurricane on record, especially for wind speeds of 140 mph.

Meteorological history

The system was first spotted east of the Lesser Antilles as a weak tropical storm on July 22. Moving northwest, the tropical storm passed near Dominica with winds of  before entering the eastern Caribbean. It reached hurricane status at 06:00 UTC on July 23, and a short while later passed just south of Puerto Rico. The cyclone attained its first peak of  before hitting Cabo Rojo early on July 24. However, the storm began rapid re-intensification as it moved over the Turks and Caicos Islands early on July 25.

The storm continued strengthening, attaining the equivalence of major hurricane status by 12:00 UTC that day. Reducing its forward speed, the storm weakened considerably after passing New Providence, losing major hurricane status by 06:00 UTC on July 27. As the storm neared the Florida coast, it curved somewhat to the north-northwest and passed just east of Cape Canaveral early on July 28. Prior to reanalysis in 2010, the storm was estimated to have made landfall farther south, near Cocoa Beach.

After landfall, the storm curved northwestward and weakened rapidly as it moved inland, weakening to a tropical storm southwest of Jacksonville. On July 29, it moved across Georgia as a weakening tropical storm and entered Alabama as a tropical depression. It continued across the southeastern United States while losing tropical characteristics, gradually beginning to curve northeastward over Arkansas, Missouri, and the Ohio Valley, becoming extratropical by 00:00 UTC on August 1. It finally dissipated the following day as it moved northeastward over Lake Ontario.

Impact
On its path, the storm killed more than 287 people in Puerto Rico, the Dominican Republic, Bahamas, and Florida. In the Bahamas, the storm caused over 100 deaths, but the exact total varies from 106 to 146. Combined with two later storms in September and October, the entire hurricane season killed more than 300 people in the Bahamas.

Puerto Rico and Hispaniola
The storm initially caused little damage until it passed near Puerto Rico, where heavy crop damage, most notably to coffee plantations in the west-central region of the island, occurred. Strong winds affected the entire island, and all rivers in the southern half of the island overflowed their banks. About 25 people drowned when heavy floods resulted from rapid rise of rivers. Total losses in Puerto Rico were estimated at $2.350 million. The storm is known as the San Liborio hurricane for its effects in Puerto Rico. Estimated damage amounted to around $3 million in eastern Santo Domingo as the storm center passed over the eastern half of Hispaniola.

The Bahamas
The cyclone caused significant damage over much of the central Bahamas. The storm destroyed 500 homes—90% of the total—on Great Exuma Island, "swept away" roads and bridges, and ruined unharvested agricultural produce, including the entire corn crop. Dead livestock littered the landscape. On Eleuthera, the storm downed coconuts and other fruit crops; strong winds and high tides leveled 240 dwellings, 14 churches, and two schools on the island. On the island, the storm rendered most roads unusable and washed the primary causeways out to sea, leaving  of water covering the island. At least 74 drownings occurred on nearby Cat Island. The storm also wrecked most of the homes on the Berry Islands. On Bimini, the hurricane razed a lighthouse and a wireless station; strong winds tore roofs off several churches and other buildings. Although damage reports are not clear, the storm caused the most significant losses on New Providence, especially in Nassau, where "some roofs were torn off entirely" and the storm was "more fearful and devastating than any most people can remember", according to an eyewitness account posted in the July issue of the Monthly Weather Review. Trees, power poles, and various debris littered streets, and many people were left homeless. Automobiles at Nassau were also reported damaged by the storm, and flooding was reported.

Florida
Areas near the point of landfall reported significant damage to buildings, crops, and communications wires, especially New Smyrna Beach. The storm disrupted telephone and electric service in Daytona Beach, while high tides destroyed beachfront businesses and sank watercraft. Points farther south along the Florida coast, such as Miami, received only a brush from the storm, resulting in rains and some light wind damage, mainly to fruit crops. The Palm Beach area reported extensive coastal flooding that damaged coastal structures. The storm was also reported to have caused damage around the point of landfall in Melbourne, where uprooted citrus trees and roofs blown off were reported. An observer on Merritt Island reported a heavy storm surge along the Indian River that damaged or destroyed homes, docks, and boats. Damage estimates in Florida exceeded $2.5 million.

Records

See also

List of Atlantic hurricanes
 List of Florida hurricanes

References

Bibliography

External links
 July issue of the Monthly Weather Review
 Hurricane history of Nassau, Bahamas
 July 1926 storm compared to Dennis and Emily of July 2005
 Puerto Rico Hurricanes and Tropical Storms

Nassau
Category 4 Atlantic hurricanes
Hurricanes in the Bahamas
Hurricanes in Puerto Rico
Nassau Hurricane
20th century in Nassau, Bahamas